Early general elections were held in the Bahamas on 10 April 1968. The result was a victory for the Progressive Liberal Party, which won 29 seats. Voter turnout was 85.5%.

Results

Elected MPs

References

Bahamas
1968 in the Bahamas
Elections in the Bahamas
Bahamas